Daniela Sabatino (born 26 June 1985) is an Italian professional footballer who plays as a striker for Serie A club Sassuolo and the Italy women's national team. She previously played for AC Bojano and ACF Reggiana in Serie A and Rapid Lugano in the Swiss Nationalliga A. She was the 2011 Serie A's second top scorer with 25 goals.

International career
She made her debut for the Italian national team in October 2011, in a 0–9 win over Macedonia where she scored a hat-trick. The 2017 UEFA Euro marked her first appearance in a final tournament. The second of the two goals in Italy's 3–2 win over Sweden earned her a Best Goal nomination in the UEFA awards.

International goals

Honours 

ASD Reggiana CF
 Italian Women's Cup: Winner 2010

Brescia
 Serie A: Winner 2014, 2016
 Italian Women's Cup: Winner 2012, 2015, 2016
 Italian Women's Super Cup: Winner 2014, 2015, 2016

References

External links 

 

Italian women's footballers
Italy women's international footballers
1985 births
Living people
People from Isernia
Women's association football forwards
Serie A (women's football) players
A.C.F. Brescia Calcio Femminile players
A.S.D. Reggiana Calcio Femminile players
Expatriate women's footballers in Switzerland
A.C. Milan Women players
2019 FIFA Women's World Cup players
Fiorentina Women's F.C. players
U.S. Sassuolo Calcio (women) players
Sportspeople from the Province of Isernia
Footballers from Molise
FF Lugano 1976 players
UEFA Women's Euro 2022 players
UEFA Women's Euro 2017 players
Italian expatriate women's footballers
Italian expatriate sportspeople in Switzerland